The 2004 FIG Rhythmic Gymnastics World Cup Final was the sixth edition of the Rhythmic Gymnastics World Cup Final, held from November 27 to November 28, 2004 in Moscow, Russia. The competition was officially organized by the International Gymnastics Federation as the last stage of a series of competitions through the 2003–2004 season.

Medalists

Medal table

References

Rhythmic Gymnastics World Cup
International gymnastics competitions hosted by Russia
2004 in gymnastics